Scoff or SCOFF may refer to:
 Scoff, a colloquial term for the act of eating, usually quickly
 "Scoff" a song by Nirvana on their album Bleach
 Scoff, a colloquial term for fellatio 
 SCOFF questionnaire, a questionnaire for screening eating disorders
 Scoff, to mock at someone's behaviour